The 2022 Toyota U.S. Figure Skating Championships was held from January 3–9, 2022 at the Bridgestone Arena in Nashville, Tennessee. Medals were awarded in the disciplines of men's singles, women's singles, pairs, and ice dance at the senior and junior levels. The results were part of the U.S. selection criteria for the 2022 World Championships, 2022 World Junior Championships, the 2022 Four Continents Championship, and the 2022 Winter Olympics.

Nashville was announced as the host in October 2019. It previously hosted the event in 1997.

Qualifying 
U.S. Figure Skating announced that due to ongoing COVID-19 pandemic, the Championship Series announced the previous year would be used again.

U.S. Figure Skating Championship Series 
The Championship Series consists of eight events held in October and November 2021. Skaters can select up to two competitions and will then be advanced to Nationals or the High Performance Development Team based on their highest score, rather than their placement.

Schedule 
The Championship Series will consist of the following competitions:

Advancement to Nationals 
More information on advancement to Nationals was announced after a webinar on June 30th. 

If the maximum number of competitors isn't reached through byes, additional spots will be available at the Championship Series. Competitors from the Championship Series will be selected on the next best total combined score. If the number of athletes with three international competitions from the approved competition list exceeds the number of available byes (4 for senior singles, 3 for senior pairs, and 5 for senior ice dance, 3 for all junior disciplines), byes will be awarded based on highest to lowest total score in the following order of importance:
 ISU Grand Prix of Figure Skating
 ISU Junior Grand Prix
 ISU Challenger Series

There will be a minimum required score for all athletes to compete to be decided in fall of 2021. Approved international competitions applicable for byes are the Grand Prix Series, Junior Grand Prix Series, Challenger Series, and Junior and Senior Grand Prix Final.

Seniors

Singles 
Singles skaters can advance to Nationals in the following ways:
 Qualifying for the same event at the ISU Grand Prix of Figure Skating Final or the ISU Junior Grand Prix of Figure Skating Final
 Top 5 finish at the 2021 Toyota U.S. Figure Skating Championships 
 2021 U.S. Figure Skating World Team Members (not including alternates)
 Medalists in the singles event at the most recent Olympic Winter Games
 Athletes who are assigned to and compete at three international assignments classified as an ISU Grand Prix, ISU Junior Grand Prix, and or ISU Challenger Series event
 The top two total combined scores from each section in the U.S. Figure Skating Championship Series
 The next best top three scores from the nation in the U.S. Figure Skating Championship Series.

There will be a maximum of 18 spots.

Pairs 
Pairs can advance to Nationals in the following ways:
 Qualifying for the same event at the ISU Grand Prix of Figure Skating Final or the ISU Junior Grand Prix of Figure Skating Final
 Top 5 finish at the 2021 Toyota U.S. Figure Skating
 2021 U.S. Figure Skating World Team Members (not including alternates)
 Medalists in the pairs event at the most recent Olympic Winter Games
 Athletes who are assigned to and compete at three international assignments classified as an ISU Grand Prix, ISU Junior Grand Prix, and or ISU Challenger Series event
 The top four total combined scores from the nation in the U.S. Figure Skating Championships Series

There will be a maximum of 12 spots.

Ice dance 
Ice dance teams can advance to Nationals in the following ways:
 Qualifying for the same event at the ISU Grand Prix of Figure Skating Final or the ISU Junior Grand Prix of Figure Skating Final
 Top 5 finish at the 2021 Toyota U.S. Figure Skating
 2021 U.S. Figure Skating World Team Members (not including alternates)
 Medalists in the ice dance event at the most recent Olympic Winter Games
 Athletes who are assigned to and compete at three international assignments classified as an ISU Grand Prix, ISU Junior Grand Prix, and or ISU Challenger Series event
 The top five total combined scores from the nation in the U.S. Figure Skating Championships Series

There will be a maximum of 15 spots.

Juniors

Singles 
Singles skaters can advance to Nationals in the following ways:
 Qualifying for the same event at the ISU Junior Grand Prix of Figure Skating Final
 Athletes who are assigned to and compete at three international assignments classified as an ISU Junior Grand Prix, and or ISU Challenger Series event
 The top three total combined scores from each section in the U.S. Figure Skating Championship Series
 The next best top three scores from the nation in the U.S. Figure Skating Championship Series
 The top three total combined novice scores from the nation in the U.S. Figure Skating Championship Series

There will be a maximum of 18 spots.

Pairs 
Pairs can advance to Nationals in the following ways:
 Qualifying for the same event at the ISU Junior Grand Prix of Figure Skating Final
 Athletes who are assigned to and compete at three international assignments classified as an ISU Junior Grand Prix, and or ISU Challenger Series event
 The top nine total combined scores from each section in the U.S. Figure Skating Championship Series

There will be a maximum of 12 spots.

Ice dance 
Ice dance teams can advance to Nationals in the following ways:
 Qualifying for the same event at the ISU Junior Grand Prix of Figure Skating Final
 Athletes who are assigned to and compete at three international assignments classified as an ISU Junior Grand Prix, and or ISU Challenger Series event
 The top twelve total combined scores from each section in the U.S. Figure Skating Championship Series

There will be a maximum of 15 spots.

Entries 
U.S. Figure Skating published the official list of preliminary entries on November 29, 2021.

Senior

Juniors

Changes to preliminary entries

Schedule
All times are listed in local time (UTC-06:00).

Medal summary

Senior

Junior

Senior results

Senior men 
William Hubbart withdrew prior to the event due to testing positive for COVID-19. Yaroslav Paniot withdrew during the free skate due to boot issues.

Senior women 
Alysa Liu and Amber Glenn withdrew after the short program due to testing positive for COVID-19.

Senior pairs 
Alexa Knierim / Brandon Frazier withdrew prior to the event after Frazier tested positive for COVID-19.

Senior ice dance 
Avonley Nguyen / Grigory Smirnov withdrew prior to the event due to Smirnov's hip injury. Raffaella Koncius / Alexey Shchepetov withdrew before the free dance due to testing positive for COVID-19.

Junior results

Junior men

Junior women

Junior pairs

Junior ice dance

International team selections

Four Continents Championships 
The 2022 Four Continents Championships were held from January 18–23 in Tallinn, Estonia. Teams will be selected using the Athlete Selection criteria. The women's team was named on January 8, 2022.

Olympic Games 
The 2022 Winter Olympics were held from February 4–20 in Beijing, China. Teams were selected using the Athlete Selection criteria. The women's team was announced on January 8, 2022.

World Junior Championships 
Commonly referred to as "Junior Worlds", the 2022 World Junior Championships were held from April 13–17, 2022 in Tallinn, Estonia. Teams were selected using the Athlete Selection criteria. The full team was named on February 3, 2022.

World Championships 
The 2022 World Championships were held from March 21–27 in Montpellier, France. Teams were selected using the Athlete Selection criteria. The women's team was named on January 8, 2022.

Notes

References

External links 
 Official website

2022
Figure Skating Championships
2022 in sports in Tennessee
U.S. Championships
Sports competitions in Nashville, Tennessee